Arthur Beard was an English footballer who played as a winger. He played in the Football League Second Division for Burnley in 1904. His single competitive appearance for the club came on 10 September 1904, when he played right wing in the 0–4 defeat to Bolton Wanderers.

References

Year of birth unknown
Year of death unknown
English footballers
Association football wingers
Burnley F.C. players
English Football League players